Kovdorskite, Mg2PO4(OH)·3H2O, is a rare, hydrated, magnesium phosphate mineral. It was first described by Kapustin et al., and is found only in the Kovdor Massif near Kovdor, Kola Peninsula, Russia. It is associated with collinsite, magnesite, dolomite, hydrotalcite, apatite, magnetite, and forsterite.

References

Further reading
Subbotin, R. P. L. V. V., & Pakhomovsky, Y. A. (1998). A new type of scandium mineralization in phoscorites and carbonatites of the Kovdor massif, Russia. Canadian Mineralogist 36:971-980. 
Yakovenchuk V N, Ivanyuk G Y, Mikhailova Y A, Selivanova E A, Krivovichev S V (2006) Pakhomovskyite, Co3(PO4)2·8H2O, a new mineral species from Kovdor, Kola Peninsula, Russia, The Canadian Mineralogist 44, 117-123

Phosphate minerals
Magnesium minerals
Monoclinic minerals
Minerals in space group 14